Peter Q. Bohlin (born 1937 in New York City, United States) is an American architect and the winner of the 2010 Gold Medal of the American Institute of Architects. He is a Fellow of the American Institute of Architects (FAIA) and a founding principal of Bohlin Cywinski Jackson, established originally in 1965 as Bohlin Powell in Wilkes-Barre, Pennsylvania.

Bohlin Cywinski Jackson has six offices in Wilkes-Barre, Pittsburgh, Philadelphia, Seattle, San Francisco, and New York City. In 1994, Bohlin Cywinski Jackson was honored with the Firm Award presented by the American Institute of Architects. Peter Bohlin has been a guest design critic and a visiting professor at architecture schools. He received his Bachelor of Architecture from Rensselaer Polytechnic Institute in 1958  and his Master of Architecture degree from Cranbrook Academy of Art. He was inducted into RPI's Alumni Hall of Fame in 2011.

Selected projects
 Copperhill Mountain Lodge: Åre, Sweden
 Grand Teton National Park Discovery and Visitors Center: Jackson, Wyoming
 Apple Store: Apple Fifth Avenue
 Apple Store: SoHo
 Apple Store: Upper West Side
 Apple Store: 14th Street
 Apple Store: Boylston Street
 Apple Store: Regent Street, London
 Apple Store: Carrousel du Louvre, Paris
 Apple Store: Sydney, Australia
 Apple Store: Ginza, Japan
 Apple Store: Shinsaibashi, Japan
 Apple Store: San Francisco
 Apple Store: Chestnut Street
 Apple Store: Scottsdale, Arizona
 Apple Store: North Michigan Avenue
 Eggers Hall, Maxwell School of Citizenship and Public Affairs, Syracuse, NY
 The William J. Nealon Federal Building and Courthouse: Scranton, Pennsylvania
 The Pocono Environmental Education Center: Dingmans Ferry, Pennsylvania
 Seattle City Hall: Seattle, Washington
 University of California, Santa Cruz Digital Arts Facility: Santa Cruz, California
 Mills College, Lorry I. Lokey Graduate School of Business: Oakland, California
 Pixar Animation Studios & Headquarters: Emeryville, California
 Adobe Systems: San Francisco, California
 Liberty Bell Center: Philadelphia, Pennsylvania
 The Barn at Fallingwater, for the Western Pennsylvania Conservancy
 Ballard Library & Neighborhood Service Center: Ballard, Seattle
 Williams College, North & South Academic Buildings: Williamstown, Massachusetts
 Forest House: Connecticut
 The Ledge House: Maryland
 Creekside House: California
 Umerani Residence: California
 House at the Shawangunks: New York
 Combs Point Residence: New York
 Envelope House: Washington
 Gosline House: Washington
 Woodway Residence: Washington
 Lily Lake Residence: Pennsylvania
 House in the Blue Mountains: Pennsylvania
 House in the Endless Mountains: Pennsylvania
 Waverly: Pennsylvania
 Point House: Montana
 House on Lake Tahoe: Nevada
 Farrar Residence: Utah
 Thomas M. Siebel Center for Computer Science, University of Illinois
 Princeton Barn: New Jersey

Awards and honors
 2010 AIA Gold Medal 66th Award Medalist
 2010 named a Senior Fellow of the Design Futures Council.
 Nine American Institute of Architects Honor Awards
 2008 AIA COTE Top Ten Green Project Award for Pocono Environmental Education Center
 2008 American Institute of Architects Pennsylvania Medal of Distinction
 2006 Rensselaer Polytechnic Institute Confers Honorary Doctoral Degree
 2004 Rensselaer Polytechnic Institute Alumni Key Award
 1994 Rensselaer Polytechnic Institute Thomas W. Phelan Fellows Award

Books
Some of the books about Peter Bohlin's firm:
 Bohlin Cywinski Jackson: The Nature of Circumstance, 2010 
 Grand Teton: A National Park Building, 2009 
 Farrar: Bohlin Cywinski Jackson, 2007  (one of their residential projects)
 Liberty Bell Center: Bohlin Cywinski Jackson, 2006 
 Arcadian Architecture: Bohlin Cywinski Jackson: 12 Houses, 2005 
 Ledge House: Bohlin Cywinski Jackson, 1999 
 The Architecture of Bohlin Cywinski Jackson, 1994

References

External links
Bohlin Cywinski Jackson Official Website
American Institute of Architects Press release 2010 Gold Medal
Peter Q. Bohlin Retrospective 1 of 2
Peter Q. Bohlin Retrospective 2 of 2
 Peter Bohlin interview
LA Times, Press Release AIA Gold 2010 December 3, 2009 by David Ng
Article: "Dream maker" by Jim Buchta, Star Tribune, March 24, 2008
AIA Pennsylvania 
Arcadian Architecture: Bohlin Cywinski Jackson 12 Houses 
Farrar: Bohlin Cywinski Jackson 
Grand Teton: A National Park Building 
Liberty Bell Center: Bohlin Cywinski Jackson 
Ledge House: Bohlin Cywinski Jackson 
Bohlin Cywinski Jackson: The Nature of Circumstance 

1937 births
Living people
Architects from Pennsylvania
Architects from New York City
Rensselaer Polytechnic Institute alumni
Cranbrook Academy of Art alumni
Recipients of the AIA Gold Medal